Björn Nagel (born January 25, 1978) is a German-Ukrainian equestrian who competes in the sport of show jumping. He competed for Ukraine at the 2008 Summer Olympics, where he did not finish in the individual portion and took tenth with his teammates in the team portion.  At the 2012 Summer Olympics, he finished in 41st place in the individual even, dropping out of the competition in the third round, and 14th in the team portion.

References

External links
Official website

1978 births
People from Brunsbüttel
German male equestrians
Equestrians at the 2008 Summer Olympics
Equestrians at the 2012 Summer Olympics
Olympic equestrians of Ukraine
Show jumping riders
Ukrainian male equestrians
Living people
German emigrants to Ukraine
Naturalized citizens of Ukraine
Sportspeople from Schleswig-Holstein